Saint-Antoine-de-Breuilh is a commune in the Dordogne department in Nouvelle-Aquitaine in southwestern France, in the urban unit of Bergerac. It was created in 1824 with the fusion of Saint-Aulaye and Le Breuilh. Saint-Antoine-de-Breuilh station has rail connections to Bordeaux, Bergerac and Sarlat-la-Canéda.

Population

See also
Communes of the Dordogne department

References

Communes of Dordogne